Saint-Ambroise-de-Kildare is a municipality in the Lanaudière region of Quebec, Canada, part of the Joliette Regional County Municipality.

History
In 1803, the geographic township of Kildare was proclaimed, named after the town in Ireland. At that time, the land was granted as title deeds or as payment for professional services. For example, the Lord of Lavaltrie entrusted the central portion to Mr. Vondevelden to pay for his surveying fees. As for the northern portion, Major Beauchamp Colclough, Crown Commissioner and Land Agent, granted land to English soldiers in 1822. He intended to establish the Town of Kildare, but his dismissal delayed the development of the place.

The first inhabitants came from Saint-Paul, Saint-Elizabeth, Lanoraie, and Berthier. Among the early settlers were also many Irish families, who cleared much land, built an English school, built a chapel, and a Protestant cemetery.

In 1832, the Parish of Saint-Jacques-de-Kildare was founded, renamed a year later to Saint-Philippe-de-Kildare. It was renamed again to its present name in 1839, since the Anglican, Methodist, and Catholic pioneers all had a devotion to Ambrose of Milan.

In 1847, the municipality was first incorporated, but abolished shortly after. In 1855, the Parish Municipality of Saint-Ambroise-de-Kildare was formed, with Charles Laporte as first mayor and D. Maigret as first treasury-secretary.

In 1956, the parish municipality lost a part of its territory when the Municipality of Sainte-Marcelline-de-Kildare was formed.

On December 6, 2014, Saint-Ambroise-de-Kildare changed from parish municipality to a (regular) municipality.

Economy
Average income per family is $56,807. 88.20% of residents are home owners, whereas 11.8% of residents are renters. The major sectors of employment are: agriculture, sales/service/retail commerce, transportation, health care, and financial institutions.

Demographics

Population

Language
Mother tongue:
 English as first language: 0.8%
 French as first language: 98.3%
 English and French as first language: 0.3%
 Other as first language: 0.7%

Culture

The French-Canadian soap opera TV series Terre Humaine was filmed in the municipality and set in the parish of Sainte-Marie des Anges, a fictional recreation of Saint-Ambroise-de-Kildare.

Education

Commission scolaire des Samares operates francophone public schools, including:
 École Notre-Dame-de-la-Paix

The Sir Wilfrid Laurier School Board operates anglophone public schools, including:
 Joliette Elementary School in Saint-Charles-Borromée
 Joliette High School in Joliette

Sports 
Saint-Ambroise-de-Kildare doesn't have any notable sporting facility. Most activity are therefore practiced in nearby Saint-Charles-Borromée.

Notable Persons from Saint-Ambroise-de-Kildare

Aimé Pelletier (1914-2010), Montreal-based surgeon, who developed a parallel career as a well-known Quebec novelist, under the pen name of Bertrand Vac.

See also
List of municipalities in Quebec

References

Incorporated places in Lanaudière
Municipalities in Quebec